HJ Lu is a computer programmer credited with creating the first Linux distribution in 1992, titled Boot/Root. Joe Klemmer described the distribution as follows:

Back in late 1991, when Linux first hit the 'Net, there were no distributions per se. The closest thing was HJ Lu's Boot/Root floppies. They were 5.25" diskettes that could be used to get a Linux system running. You booted from the boot disk and then, when prompted, inserted the root disk. After a while you got a command prompt. Back in those days if you wanted to boot from your hard drive you had to use a hex editor on the master boot record of your disk. Something that was definitely not for the faint of heart. I remember when Erik Ratcliffe wrote the first instructions (this was long before HOWTO files) on how to do just that. It wasn't until later that anything you could call a real distribution appeared.

References 

Free software people
Free software programmers
Linux people